The Louisville hotspot is a volcanic hotspot responsible for the volcanic activity that has formed the Louisville Ridge in the southern Pacific Ocean.

Location
The Louisville hotspot is believed to lie close to the Pacific-Antarctic Ridge, although its exact location is uncertain.

Geological history

The Louisville hotspot is believed to have been active since at least 78.8 ± 1.3 Ma based on age of the oldest seamount (Osbourn ). This duration is comparable to that of the Hawaiian-Emperor seamount chain, although the rate of volcanism at the two chains are relatively different and the Louisville Ridge has a relatively small bend compared to that in the Hawaiian-Emperior chain. During the Early Oligocene period, the Louisville hotspot's magma source rate was much steadier than the Hawaii hotspot rate, and had a lower total volume in eruption. During the Late Oligocene, the magma source decreased to a small fraction of that in the Hawaiian-Emperor seamount chain, such that none of the volcanoes has emerged above sea level in the past 11 million years. The Louisville Ridge is only half as wide as the Hawaiian-Emperior seamount chain. Therefore, unlike the Hawaii hotspot, the Louisville hotspot is believed to have decreased in activity with time.

The Louisville hotspot may have created the Ontong Java Plateau, the world's largest oceanic plateau, around 120 million years ago. The modelled locations of the plateau and hotspot at the time do not coincide under one recent plate reconstruction, arguing against this, although other factors mean their linkage may still be possible.

See also
 Christmas Island Seamount Province
 Arago hotspot
 Rarotonga hotspot
 Hollister Ridge
 Osbourn Seamount the oldest of the Louisville Ridge

References

Hotspots of the Pacific Ocean